In measure theory, a branch of mathematics, a finite measure or totally finite measure is a special measure that always takes on finite values. Among finite measures are probability measures. The finite measures are often easier to handle than more general measures and show a variety of different properties depending on the sets they are defined on.

Definition 
A measure  on measurable space  is called a finite measure if it satisfies

By the monotonicity of measures, this implies

 

If  is a finite measure, the measure space  is called a finite measure space or a totally finite measure space.

Properties

General case 
For any measurable space, the finite measures form a convex cone in the Banach space of signed measures with the total variation norm. Important subsets of the finite measures are the sub-probability measures, which form a convex subset, and the probability measures, which are the intersection of the unit sphere in the normed space of signed measures and the finite measures.

Topological spaces 
If  is a Hausdorff space and  contains the Borel -algebra then every finite measure is also a locally finite Borel measure.

Metric spaces 
The weak topology corresponds to the weak* topology in functional analysis. If  is also separable, the weak convergence is metricized by the Lévy–Prokhorov metric.

Polish spaces 
If  is Polish, then the set of all finite measures with the weak topology is Polish too.

References 

Measures (measure theory)